Statistics of Emperor's Cup in the 1973 season.

Overview
It was contested by 26 teams, and Mitsubishi Motors won the championship.

Results

1st round
Chuo University 3–0 Nippon Steel Kamaishi
Otsuka Pharmaceutical 3–1 Osaka University of Economics

2nd round
Chuo University 1–4 Toyota Motors
Eidai Industries 1–0 Dainichi Cable Industries
Meijo University 0–1 Waseda University
Kyushu Sangyo University 2–3 Osaka University of Commerce
Kyoto Shiko 2–2 (PK 2–3) Honda
Sapporo University 0–4 Nippon Sport Science University
Teihens FC 0–8 Hosei University
Tanabe Pharmaceuticals 2–1 Otsuka Pharmaceutical

3rd round
Nippon Kokan 3–0 Toyota Motors
Eidai Industries 0–1 Toyo Industries
Furukawa Electric 2–2 (PK 3–1) Waseda University
Osaka University of Commerce 0–3 Hitachi
Yanmar Diesel 4–1 Honda
Nippon Sport Science University 0–2 Towa Estate Development
Mitsubishi Motors 1–1 (PK 5–4) Hosei University
Tanabe Pharmaceuticals 0–3 Nippon Steel

Quarterfinals
Nippon Kokan 3–4 Toyo Industries
Furukawa Electric 1–3 Hitachi
Yanmar Diesel 1–0 Towa Estate Development
Mitsubishi Motors 2–0 Nippon Steel

Semifinals
Toyo Industries 0–2 Hitachi
Yanmar Diesel 0–1 Mitsubishi Motors

Final

Hitachi 1–2 Mitsubishi Motors
Mitsubishi Motors won the championship.

References
 NHK

Emperor's Cup
Emperor's Cup
1974 in Japanese football